Freedom Dance is an animated documentary produced by Steven Fischer and Craig Herron. The film retells the escape of Edward and Judy Hilbert from Communist Hungary during the Hungarian Revolution of 1956. The film is narrated by actress Mariska Hargitay, and won many awards including the CINE Masters Series Award.

References

IMDB 
Fulbright, Freedom Dance Screens in Budapest 
The American Hungarian Federation 
The Official Freedom Dance Website 

American animated documentary films
American short documentary films
2007 films
2007 short documentary films
2000s American films